The second Turnbull ministry (Liberal–National Coalition) was the 70th ministry of the Government of Australia, led by Prime Minister Malcolm Turnbull. It succeeded the first Turnbull ministry following the 2016 Australian federal election on 2 July 2016.

On 13 January 2017, Sussan Ley resigned from her portfolios after an expenses scandal. In the following rearrangement, the roles of Greg Hunt and Arthur Sinodinos were changed, while Ken Wyatt became the first Indigenous Australian to serve as a federal minister.

On 25 July 2017, Matt Canavan resigned from Cabinet over doubts as to his eligibility to be a member of the parliament, after discovering that he was considered by the Italian authorities to be a citizen of Italy. Dual citizens are generally ineligible to be elected or sit as a member of parliament under section 44 of the Australian Constitution. Barnaby Joyce took on Canavan's portfolio. On 27 October 2017, Joyce and Fiona Nash were disqualified from parliament by the High Court, also due to holding dual citizenship, while Canavan was ruled eligible.

The ministry ended with Malcolm Turnbull's replacement by Scott Morrison following the Liberal Party of Australia leadership spills, 2018.

Final Cabinet composition
Following Deputy Prime Minister Barnaby Joyce's resignation from cabinet, the fifth arrangement of the second Turnbull ministry was sworn in on 26 February 2018 by the Governor of Victoria, Linda Dessau, in her capacity as Administrator of the Commonwealth while Governor-General Sir Peter Cosgrove was overseas.  Michael McCormack took on Joyce's roles after being elected National Party leader that morning. Rearrangement of other portfolios took effect from 5 March 2018 when the Governor-General Sir Peter Cosgrove swore in the newly appointed Ministers and Parliamentary Secretaries: Darren Chester as Minister for Veterans’ Affairs and Minister for Defence Personnel; Keith Pitt as Assistant Minister to the Deputy Prime Minister; and Mark Coulton as Assistant Minister to the Minister for Trade, Tourism and Investment. Damian Drum and Luke Hartsuyker were demoted from the ministry.

The composition lasted until the 2018 Liberal Party of Australia leadership spills, when a number of ministers resigned from the cabinet to support the spill. These include Peter Dutton, Michael Sukkar, James McGrath, Concetta Fierravanti-Wells, Angus Taylor, Zed Seselja, Michael Keenan and Steve Ciobo. Turnbull refused to accept some. Turnbull was ousted as party leader and Prime Minister and replaced by Scott Morrison.

Cabinet

Outer Ministry

Assistant Ministers

First arrangement
The first arrangement of the second Turnbull ministry was sworn in on 19 July 2016 and continued unaltered until the resignation of Sussan Ley on 13 January 2017, following an investigation into her travel expenses. Arthur Sinodinos briefly acted in Ley's portfolios until the new ministry was sworn in on 24 January 2017.

Cabinet

Outer Ministry

Assistant Ministers

Second arrangement
The second arrangement of the second Turnbull ministry was sworn in by the Governor-General, Sir Peter Cosgrove, on 24 January 2017 following the resignation of Sussan Ley. Newly appointed ministers included Ken Wyatt , as the first Indigenous Australian to serve as a minister for an Australian Government department, appointed to the role of Minister for Indigenous Health and as Minister for Aged Care. Greg Hunt was appointed to Ley's former portfolios in Health and Sport; Arthur Sinodinos was appointed to Hunt's former portfolio as Minister for Industry, Innovation and Science. Scott Ryan was given additional responsibilities as the Minister Assisting the Prime Minister for Cabinet. David Gillespie, previously Assistant Minister for Rural Health was promoted as Assistant Minister for Health and Michael Sukkar was appointed as the Assistant Minister to the Treasurer. The position of Cabinet Secretary was abolished.

On 25 July 2017, during the 2017 Australian parliamentary eligibility crisis, Matt Canavan resigned from Cabinet over doubts as to his eligibility to be a member of the parliament, after discovering that he was considered by the Italian authorities to be a citizen of Italy. Dual citizens are ineligible to be elected or sit as a member of parliament under section 44 of the Australian Constitution.

Cabinet

Outer Ministry

Assistant Ministers

Third arrangement
The third arrangement of the second Turnbull ministry was sworn in by the Governor-General, Sir Peter Cosgrove, on 27 October 2017 following the High Court ruling that Barnaby Joyce and Fiona Nash were invalidly elected due to holding dual citizenship. The same ruling found that Canavan was eligible, allowing him to return to the role of Minister for Resources and Northern Australia that had been held by Joyce in his absence. Prime Minister Malcolm Turnbull took on Joyce's portfolio of Agriculture and Water Resources, and Nigel Scullion took over as the parliamentary leader of the National Party, while the position of Deputy Prime Minister remained vacant with Julie Bishop serving as acting Prime Minister when necessary. Nash's roles were split between Darren Chester (Regional Development, Territories and Local Government) and Mitch Fifield (Regional Communications) as acting ministers.

Joyce regained his Agriculture and Water Resource portfolio on 6 December 2017 after he was re-elected in the 2017 New England by-election.

Cabinet

Outer Ministry

Assistant Ministers

Fourth arrangement
The fourth arrangement of the second Turnbull ministry was sworn in by the Governor-General, Sir Peter Cosgrove, on 20 December 2017 following a period of ministerial resignations due to the 2017 Australian parliamentary eligibility crisis including the appointment of Scott Ryan as the President of the Senate, the retirement of George Brandis to take up Australian High Commissioner to the United Kingdom, the recovery of Arthur Sinodinos from cancer, the changes to administrative arrangements with the creation of the Department of Home Affairs.

Cabinet

Outer Ministry

Assistant Ministers

See also

Turnbull government
First Turnbull ministry

References 

Ministries of Elizabeth II
2016 establishments in Australia
2016 in Australian politics
2017 in Australian politics
2018 disestablishments in Australia
2018 in Australian politics
Turnbull 2
Cabinets established in 2016
Cabinets disestablished in 2018
History of Australia (1945–present)
Liberal Party of Australia
National Party of Australia
Turnbull Government